The Feyenoord Jubilee Tournament was a friendly tournament between August 1, 2008 to August 3, 2008 to celebrate the centenary of the Dutch football club Feyenoord. The tournament includes four teams, they are: Feyenoord, Celtic, Tottenham Hotspur and Borussia Dortmund. All of Feyenoord's three opponents are famous opponents that they played before in European finals.

Tottenham Hotspur won the trophy.

Fixtures

Day 1

Day 2

Final standings

Scorers

References

External links 
feyenoordjubileumtoernooi.com

Jubilee Tournament